

This is a list of the National Register of Historic Places listings in Cuyahoga County, Ohio.

This is intended to be a complete list of the properties and districts on the National Register of Historic Places in Cuyahoga County, Ohio, United States. Latitude and longitude coordinates are provided for many National Register properties and districts; these locations may be seen together in an online map.

There are 424 properties and districts listed on the National Register in the county, including 4 National Historic Landmarks. 160 of these properties and districts, including 1 National Historic Landmark, are located outside of Cleveland, and are listed here, while the properties and districts in Cleveland are listed separately. Three properties and districts are split between Cleveland and other parts of the county, and are thus included on both lists.

Current listings

Cleveland

Exclusive of Cleveland

|}

Former listing

|}

See also
 List of National Historic Landmarks in Ohio
 Listings in neighboring counties: Geauga, Lake, Lorain, Medina, Portage, Summit
 National Register of Historic Places listings in Ohio

References

 
Cuyahoga